In mathematics, the Hasse invariant of an algebra is an invariant attached to a Brauer class of algebras over a field.  The concept is named after Helmut Hasse.  The invariant plays a role in local class field theory.

Local fields
Let K be a local field with valuation v and D a K-algebra.  We may assume D is a division algebra with centre K of degree n.  The valuation v can be extended to D, for example by extending it compatibly to each commutative subfield of D: the value group of this valuation is (1/n)Z.

There is a commutative subfield L of D which is unramified over K, and D splits over L.  The field L is not unique but all such extensions are conjugate by the Skolem–Noether theorem, which further shows that any automorphism of L is induced by a conjugation in D.  Take γ in D such that conjugation by γ induces the Frobenius automorphism of L/K and let v(γ) = k/n.  Then k/n modulo 1 is the Hasse invariant of D.  It depends only on the Brauer class of D.

The Hasse invariant is thus a map defined on the Brauer group of a local field K to the divisible group Q/Z.   Every class in the Brauer group is represented by a class in the Brauer group of an unramified extension of  L/K of degree n, which by the Grunwald–Wang theorem and the Albert–Brauer–Hasse–Noether theorem we may take to be a cyclic algebra (L,φ,πk) for some k mod n, where φ is the Frobenius map and π is a uniformiser.  The invariant map attaches the element k/n mod 1 to the class.  This exhibits the invariant map as a homomorphism

The invariant map extends to Br(K) by representing each class by some element of Br(L/K) as above.

For a non-Archimedean local field, the invariant map is a group isomorphism.

In the case of the field R of real numbers, there are two Brauer classes, represented by the algebra R itself and the quaternion algebra H.  It is convenient to assign invariant zero to the class of R and invariant 1/2 modulo 1 to the quaternion class.

In the case of the field C of complex numbers, the only Brauer class is the trivial one, with invariant zero.

Global fields
For a global field K, given a central simple algebra D over K then for each valuation v of K we can consider the extension of scalars Dv = D ⊗ Kv  The extension Dv splits for all but finitely many v, so that the local invariant of Dv is almost always zero.  The Brauer group Br(K) fits into an exact sequence

where S is the set of all valuations of K and the right arrow is the sum of the local invariants.  The injectivity of the left arrow is the content of the Albert–Brauer–Hasse–Noether theorem. Exactness in the middle term is a deep fact from global class field theory.

References

Further reading
 

Field (mathematics)
Algebraic number theory